Gilla na Trínóite Ua Dálaigh, Irish poet, killed 1166.

Gilla na Trínóite was an early member of the Ó Dálaigh family of poets. At the time of his death, he was Ollamh of Kingdom of Desmond.

The Annals of Inisfallen state, sub anno 1166, that:

 Gilla na Trínóite Ua Dálaig, ollav of Desmumu, was slain.

He does not appear in the Daly family genealogies.

See also

 Cú Connacht Ua Dálaigh, died 1139.
 Ragnall Ua Dálaigh, died 1161.
 Tadhg Ua Dálaigh, died 1181.
 Aonghus Ó Dálaigh, fl. c. 1200.

External links
 Annals of Loch Cé
 The Tribes of Ireland: A Satire by Aengus O'Daly

People from County Westmeath
Medieval Irish poets
12th-century Irish writers
1166 deaths
Year of birth unknown
12th-century Irish poets
Irish male poets